is a Japanese manga series created by Toshihiro Fujiwara. It was serialized in Kodansha's Comic BomBom. The manga tells the story about a boy named Sho Yamato who loves mountain biking. It was adapted into a 52-episode anime series, produced by Aniplex and Trans Arts. It aired from October 1, 2005 to September 30, 2006. A toyline was also made by Tomy.

Plot
Sho Yamato is a boy who enjoys MTB a lot. He and his friends Kakeru and Makoto, always practices at the "X-Zone", a place which his father Takeshi Yamato made for MTB, while riding on a bike his father had built called "Flame Kaiser". 

One day, Sho is challenged to a race by a MTB group Team Shark Tooth headed by his classmate and rival Gabu Samejima, and whoever wins the race will get the X-Zone. For Sho, the X-Zone had always been a place of happy memories. He has spent many days with his father, who disappeared, so he accepts the game in order to save X-Zone. During the race with Gabu, a black smoke suddenly covers the ground around them, and are sent to another world which is also called as "X-Zone."

When Sho wakes up, he finds Kakeru, Makoto, and his MTB Flame Kaiser are also present. While they are wondering what has happened, MTB riders arrive and challenges Sho to an Idaten battle, a form of MTB race in the X-Zone. They tells that the only way for Sho to return home is by collecting 10 gold emblems by winning Idaten battles while making their way to X-City which is at the epicenter of the X-Zone. This is how Sho comes down to compete in Idaten Battles at various courses such as ghost towns, volcanoes, ancient ruins, deserts, and snow-topped mountains. Now Sho must Idaten Battle for the sake of returning home.

Before an Idaten Battle begins, the MTB riders will put on their bike helmets while quoting "Ready, set, and go." When their bike helmets are on, a full mountain biking suit appears on them during the Idaten Battles. Sho's group decides to head towards the X-City, the main city of X-Zone so that they can get the 10 gold emblem and can return to their home. They also face off against Team Shark Tooth and their various allies even when he arrives in X-City where Gabu is actually the dictator. After defeating Gabu, the black smoke takes them back to earth, but Makoto's brother Kyoichi Shido remains there. 

They find that only a half day has gone after staying 3 months in X-Zone. However, they return back to X-Zone due to various circumstances, and also find that Imperial X, the bike which controls the energy levels of X-Zone is stolen by mysterious Team X, who controls people by defeating other racers and planting Team X emblem on their bikes. Sho also learns that Takeshi, who is actually alive, is a member of the X-Zone. They also learn that Kyoichi is also defeated by Team X and has become their leader. Sho later defeats Kyoichi in the race and makes him normal, but later learns that Takeshi is the leader of Team X and was the one who stole Imperial X; had been controlling Kyoichi earlier. 

It is revealed that Takeshi actually created the MTB bikes in order to save the world from the destruction caused by the activities of an ancient devil who wants to take revenge. An engaging battle ensues, where Sho defeats Takeshi in a MTB battle and makes him normal. Sho stays back in X-Zone as it is his homeland, while the gang, along with Kyoichi emotionally return back to earth. Few days later while the gang are practicing, they reminisce about Sho. To their shock and happiness, Sho returns back to earth telling that Takeshi has sent him to be with his friends.

Characters

Main
 
 
 Sho Yamato is a boy who loves MTB riding and he owns the Idaten Bike Flame Kaiser.

 
 
 Makoto Shido is best friends with Kakeru Sakamaki and Sho Yamato. They are classmates at their school. Her Idaten Bike is Neptune.

 
 
 Kakero is one of the main characters in the series. His main job in their team is to fix Sho, Makoto and Ayumu's bikes and also to change their bikes' gears whenever they are going to have an Idaten Battle.

 
 
 Hosuke is a talking owl who befriends Sho, Makoto, and Kakero. He has become their companion during their travels through the X-Zone.

Supporting
 
 
 Kyoichi Shido is Makoto Shido's elder brother. He is amazingly talented at everything, especially mountain biking. He is very protective towards his sister, also being a serious person. In the first few episodes, he used to follow Makoto, Sho, Kakeru and Hosuke but he always kept his distance. His MTB is Thunder Emperor and he is really an awesome unbeatable and impeccable rider, being a trial bike champion.

 
 
 Yuki is a mechanic who is one of the protagonists of the anime. She is actually a princess from a very respected family. She is an expert mechanic and helps Sho and co. on various occasions. Arthur and Yuki have helped protect the secrets of the X-Zone. She has been wanting to be a mechanic from her childhood. She is Hosuke's granddaughter.

 
 
 Koei is a ninja rider hired Gabu Samejima and was a member of Team ST. It is later revealed that he did so because he could not afford a doctor for his sister, Kiku. Once Kiku fell in Gabu's clutches, Sho Yamato had to help rescue her. He rides the Idaten Bike Aero Scissors. His special move is the "Ninjutsu Hurricane" by which he can create a hurricane around him.

 
 
 Arthur is a Knight biker and the owner of the sixth Idaten Bike Hammer Head. He is one of the guardians of the X-Tower.

 
 
 Ayumu Yamato is Sho Yamato 's younger brother. He joins the group during their return to the X-Zone. Ayumu used to behave like a maniac and ride without any control when riding MTB's until Koei taught him about control. He rides the Idaten bike Imperial Dragon.

  / Takeru Yamato
 
 Takeshi Yamato Sho Yamato's father. While falling off his bike in an accident, he was transferred to the X-Zone to repair Imperial X. He had built Flame Kaiser, Thunder Emperor, Neptune, Imperial Tiger, Imperial Dragon, Aero Scissors, Hammer Head and Bloody Fang as well. Possessed by an ancient evil, he rode Imperial X who's attack was Even's Destruction. He defeated Flame Kaiser and took away its emblem but lost in the rematch where Sho rode with the combined forces of Bloody Fang, Thunder Emperor, Aero Scissors, Hammer Head, Imperial Dragon and Neptune. He made the Idaten Bikes to restore and maintain peace in the X-Zone and protect Imperial X.

 
 
Gabu Samejima is the strongest MTB Rider along with Kyoichi Shido. He rides the powerful Idaten bike, Bloody Fang. Gabu and Taiga Samejima are the leaders of Team Shark Tooth aka Team ST. He goes to the same school as Sho, Makoto, and Kakeru. When Team Shark Tooth arrived in the X-Zone, Gabu became the dictator of X-City after overthrowing it's mayor.

 
 
 The older brother of Gabu who serves as his second-in-command of Team Shark Tooth

 
 Moving Sea Anemone Kiyoshi 
 Moon Jellyfish Mitsuru 
 Sea Roach Sayji 
 Sunfish Mantaro 
 Moving Sea Anemone Kiyoshi, Moon Jellyfish Mitsuru, Sea Roach Sayji, and Sunfish Mantaro are four MTB riders that are the members of Team Shark Tooth.

Yoko and Rika are two sisters who are resort tycoons and members of Team Shark Tooth. Yoko is a MTB rider while her sister Rika is a mechanic.

Shadow is a mysterious Dracula-like assassin biker working for Gabu Samejima. He specializes in battling in dark places like subways etc.

Koei also known as ninja rider, originally worked for Gabu Samejima and was a member of Team ST. It is later revealed that he did so because he couldn't afford a doctor for his sister, Kiku. Once Kiku fell in Gabu's clutches, Sho Yamato had to help rescue her. He rides the Idaten Bike Aero Scissors. His special move is the "Ninjutsu Hurricane" by which he can create a hurricane around him.

Captain Jackal is a ship captain who is a member of Team ST. He and his crewmen challenged Sho when Sho was on a ship to X-City. They did get away with some of Sho's Emblems at the cost of Captain Jackal's ship and handed them to Gabu and Taiga.

Episode list
1. This Is An MTB Battle!
Kore ga MTB BATTLE da!
これがＭＴＢバトルだ！

2. Big Escape! Sand Dune Battle
Daidassou! Sakyuu no tatakai
大脱走！砂丘の戦い

3. Crash! The First Defeat?
Shougeki! Hajimete no haiboku?
衝撃！はじめての敗北！？

4. Take Back! My MTB!
Torimodose! Ore no MTB!
とり戻せ！オレのMTB

5. Fiery Volcano Battle!!
Honoo no kazan no BATTLE!!
炎の火山バトル！

6. A High-Tech Group's Challenge
HIGH-TECH shuudan no chousen
ハイテク集団の挑戦

7. Ouch! MTB's Graveyard
Auu! MTB no hakaba
アウッ！MTBの墓場

8. Enter Neptune!
NEPTUNE toujou!
ネプチューン登場！

9. The Identity Of The Masked Boy
Kamen shounen no shoutai
仮面少年の正体！

10. The Strongest Rival Appears!
最強の敵、出現！
Saikyou no teki, shutsugen

11. Onboard Battle! Team ST's Trap
船上バトル！チームＳＴの罠
Senjou BATTLE! TEAM ST no wana

12. The Admired Celeb Resort City
憧れのゴールドセレブリゾートシティ
Akogare no CELEB RESORT CITY

13. School Battle! Explosion, Idaten Cross!
学校バトル！炸裂、韋駄天クロス!
Gakkou BATTLE! Sakuretsu, Idaten CROSS!

14. The Man Who Beat Flame Kaiser?
フレイムカイザーを倒した男！？
FLAME KAISER o taosu otoko?

15. The Prince of MTB
ＭＴＢの王子様
MTB no oujisama

16. Struggle In The Rain, Awakened Neptune
雨の中の死闘、目覚めよネプチューン
Ame no naka no shitou, mezameru NEPTUNE

17. Finally Understand! Team ST's Secret
ついにわかった！チームＳ
.hhvＴの秘密
Tsui ni wakatta! TEAM ST no himitsu

18. A New Assassin! The Test's Battle Between Siblings
新たな刺客！試練の兄妹バトル
Aratana shikaku! Shiren no kyoudai BATTLE

19. Showdown! Flame Kaiser VS. Thunder Emperor
対決！フレイムカイザーVS.サンダーエンペラー
Taiketsu! FLAME KAISER VS. THUNDER EMPEROR

20. Formidable Opponent! Ninja Rider Koei
強敵！忍者ライダー孤影
Kyouteki! NINJA RIDER Koei

21. X City's Gate Guardians
Ｘシティの門番
X CITY no monban

22. Arrival! X City
やったぜ到着！Ｘシティ
Yattaze touchaku! X CITY

23. The Idaten Battle Tournament Begins!
韋駄天バトルトーナメント開幕！
Idaten BATTLE TOURNAMENT kaimaku!

24. Crash! Flame Kaiser VS. Neptune
激突！フレイムカイザーVS.ネプチューン
Gekitotsu! FLAME KAISER VS.NEPTUNE

25. Hammerhead! The 6th Idaten Bike
ハンマーヘッド！6台目の韋駄天バイク
HAMMERHEAD! 6daime no Idaten BIKE

26. Certain Kill! Shido Special
必殺！ 獅堂スペシャル
Hissatsu! Shido SPECIAL

27. Battle! Hammerhead VS. Aero Scissors!
激闘！ハンマーヘッドVS. エアロシザース
Gekitou! HAMMERHEAD VS. AERO SCISSORS

28. The Final Showdown's Conspiracy
陰謀の決勝戦
Inbou no kesshousen

29. Final Battle! Who Will Be The Victor?
ファイナルバトル！優勝は誰の手に？
FINAL BATTLE! Yuushou wa dare no te ni?

30. Charge! X Tower
突入！ Ｘタワー
Totsunyuu! X TOWER

31. Decisive Battle! Flame Kaiser VS. Bloody Fang
最終決戦！フレイムカイザーVSブラッディファング
Saishuu kessen! Flame Kaiser VS. Bloody Fang

32. Farewell X Zone
さよならXゾーン
Sayonara, X ZONE

33. A New, Formidable Enemy - The Name Is Team X
新たなる強敵、その名はチームＸ
Aratanaru kyouteki, sono na wa TEAM X

34. To X Zone Again!
再びＸゾーンへ！
Matatabi X ZONE e!

35. Shock! Sho's Father Is Alive
衝撃！生きていた翔の父
Shougeki! Ikite ita Shou no chichi

36. Roar! Imperial Dragon!!
爆走！インペリアルDG！！
Baksou! IMPERIAL DG!!

37. The Feared Dark Emblem
恐怖のダークエンブレム
Kyofu no DARK EMBLEM

38. Gabu's Allure, Flame Kaiser's In A Pinch!
牙舞の誘惑、フレイムカイザー大ピンチ！
Gabu no yuuwaku, FLAME KAISER dai pinch!

39. Climax! Imperial Dragon VS. Aero Scissors
Hakunetsu! IMPERIAL DG VS. AERO SCISSORS
白熱！インペリアルDG VS. エアロシザース

40. The Nameless Forest's Vermin
ナナシの森の悪玉菌
Nanashi no mori no akudamakin

41. Arthur's Challenge! The Road To The Island Of Illusion
ARTHUR no chousen! Maboroshi no shima e no michi
アーサーの挑戦！幻の島への道

42. Idaten Bike's Big Gathering! The Showdown With Team X!
Idaten BIKE no daishuugou! TEAM X to no kessen!
韋駄天バイク大集合！チームXとの決戦！

43. Sho VS. Shido! Battle Of Life Or Death!
翔VS.獅堂！魂を賭けたバトル！
Sho VS. Shido! Tamashii o kaketa BATTLE!

44. Shocking Reunion! Imperial X Appears
衝撃の再会！インペリアルX出現！
Shougeki no saikai! IMPERIAL X shutsugen!

45. The Second Island Appears! The Beginning Of The World's Collapse
第二の島現る！世界崩壊の始まり
Daini no shima arawaru! Sekai houkai no hajimari

46. Charge! Team X VS. Imperial Dragon
Daishuugeki! TEAM X VS. IMPERIAL DG
大襲撃！ チームX VS. インペリアルDG

47. The Legendary Training Grounds, Sho's Special Training!
伝説の練習場、翔の特訓！
Densetsu no renshoujou, Sho no tokkun!

48. The Miracle Power! New Secret Move Explosion
Kiseki no chikara! Shin hissatsu waza sakuretsu
奇跡の力！新必殺技炸裂

49. Flame Kaiser Vs Team Idaten! フレイムカイザーVS.チーム韋駄天ライダー

50. The Battle for Imperial Island !          決戦！インペリアルアイランド！

51. The Battle of Destiny,The Final Battle! 運命の対決、山登翔 最後のバトル！

52. Awakening the World (Series finale)
新しい旅立ち、世界よ甦れ！

References

External links
 
 

2005 manga
Japanese children's animated sports television series
Anime series based on manga
Aniplex
Children's manga
Cycling in anime and manga
Isekai anime and manga
Kodansha manga
Production I.G
TVB
TV Tokyo original programming